Huang Shen (1687–1772) was a Chinese painter during the Qing Dynasty. Huang was born in Ninghua, Fujian province, to a poor family. His courtesy names were Gongshou and Gongmao. His pseudonym was Yingpiaozi.

He began his training under the painter Shangguan Zhou. In the earliest part of his career he excelled at cursive calligraphy and favored a meticulous style modelled after Ni Zan. He became better known as an artistic innovator who was one of the Eight Eccentrics of Yangzhou. When it came to paintings of people he favored images of religious, historic, and common people. His more famous works include The Drunk Monk and Shepherd Su Wu.

Notes

References
 Ci hai bian ji wei yuan hui. Ci hai. Shanghai: Shanghai cishu chubanshe, 1979.

Sources
Chinese Paintings in the Ashmolean Museum Oxford (73) Oxford 
National Palace Museum
China culture.org
HK artclub

1687 births
1772 deaths
Qing dynasty painters
People from Sanming
Painters from Fujian
18th-century Chinese painters